Common variable immunodeficiency (CVID) is an immune disorder characterized by recurrent infections and low antibody levels, specifically in immunoglobulin (Ig) types IgG, IgM and IgA. Symptoms generally include high susceptibility to foreign invaders, chronic lung disease, and inflammation and infection of the gastrointestinal tract. CVID affects males and females equally. The condition can be found in children or teens but is generally not diagnosed or recognized until adulthood. The average age of diagnosis is between 20 and 50. However, symptoms vary greatly between people. "Variable" refers to the heterogeneous clinical manifestations of this disorder, which include recurrent bacterial infections, increased risk for autoimmune disease and lymphoma, as well as gastrointestinal disease. CVID is a lifelong disease.

Signs and symptoms 

The symptoms of CVID vary between those affected. Its main features are hypogammaglobulinemia and recurrent infections. Hypogammaglobulinemia manifests as a significant decrease in the levels of IgG antibodies, usually alongside IgA antibodies; IgM antibody levels are also decreased in about half of those affected. Infections are a direct result of the low antibody levels in the circulation, which do not adequately protect them against pathogens. The microorganisms that most frequently cause infections in CVID are bacteria Haemophilus influenzae, Streptococcus pneumoniae, and Staphylococcus aureus. Pathogens less often isolated from those affected include Neisseria meningitidis, Pseudomonas aeruginosa, and Giardia lamblia. Infections mostly affect the respiratory tract (nose, sinuses, bronchi, lungs) and the ears; they can also occur at other sites, such as the eyes, skin, and gastrointestinal tract. These infections respond to antibiotics but can recur upon discontinuation of antibiotics. Bronchiectasis can develop when severe recurrent pulmonary infections are left untreated.

In addition to infections, people with CVID can develop complications. These include:
 Autoimmune manifestations, e.g. pernicious anemia, autoimmune haemolytic anemia (AHA), idiopathic thrombocytopenic purpura (ITP), psoriasis, vitiligo, rheumatoid arthritis, primary hypothyroidism, atrophic gastritis. Autoimmunity is the main complication in people with CVID, appearing in some form in up to 50% of individuals;
 Malignancies, particularly non-Hodgkin's lymphoma and gastric carcinoma;
 Enteropathy, which manifests with a blunting of intestinal villi and inflammation, and is usually accompanied by symptoms such as abdominal cramps, diarrhea, constipation, and in some cases malabsorption and weight loss. Symptoms of CVID enteropathy are similar to those of celiac disease, but do not respond to a gluten-free diet. Infectious causes must be excluded before a diagnosis of enteropathy can be made, as people with CVID are more susceptible to intestinal infections, e.g. by Giardia lamblia;
 Lymphocytic infiltration of tissues, which can cause enlargement of lymph nodes (lymphadenopathy), of the spleen (splenomegaly) and of the liver (hepatomegaly), as well as the formation of granulomas. In the lung this is known as granulomatous–lymphocytic interstitial lung disease.

Anxiety and depression can occur as a result of dealing with the other symptoms.

CVID patients generally complain of severe fatigue.

As with any antibody deficiency, the most common types of infections and illnesses involve the ears, sinuses, nose, and lungs. Common infections include:

 Pneumonia
 Ear infections
 Sinusitis
 Chronic coughing (lasting from a few weeks to many months)
 Gastrointestinal infections

Gastrovascular infections or inflammation are very common for those with CVID. Signs of a gastrovascular infection include abdominal pain, nausea, bloating, vomiting, diarrhea, and weight loss. Many individuals with CVID have an impaired ability to absorb nutrients, including vitamins, proteins, minerals, fats, and sugar within the digestive tract.

Due to changes in development in B cells, some individuals with CVID have accumulations of lymphocytes in lymphoid tissues. This can cause mild to severely swollen lymph nodes or inflammation of the spleen. In addition, a certain percentage of individuals with CVID are more susceptible to developing certain forms of cancer, more so than those without the condition. The two most common cancers in common variable immunodeficiency patients include lymphoma and certain stomach cancers. The risk for these given cancers is almost fifty times greater in common variable immunodeficiency patients than those without.

People with common variable immunodeficiency have trouble fighting off infections due to the lack of antibodies produced which normally resist invading microbes. Due to impaired antibody development vaccines are not effective. Recurring bacterial infections are generally found in the upper and lower areas of the respiratory tract. Many who have a recurring lung infection, report developing, chronic lung diseases, and potentially life-threatening complications later in life.

Causes
The cause of CVID is poorly understood. A likely cause are Deletions in genes that encode cell surface proteins and cytokine receptors, such as CD19, CD20, CD21, and CD80. Additionally, the disease is defined by T cell defects, namely reduced proliferative capacity. The condition is hard to diagnose, taking on average 6–7 years after onset. CVID is a primary immunodeficiency. The underlying causes of CVID are largely obscure. Genetic mutations can be identified as the cause of disease in about 10% of people, while familial inheritance accounts for 10–25% of cases. Rather than arising from a single genetic mutation, CVID seems to result from variety of mutations that all contribute to a failure in antibody production.

Mutations in the genes encoding ICOS, TACI, CD19, CD20, CD21, CD80 and BAFFR have been identified as causative of CVID. Susceptibility to CVID may also be linked to the major histocompatibility complex (MHC) of the genome, particularly to DR-DQ haplotypes. A mutation in the NFKB2 gene has recently been shown to cause CVID-like symptoms in a murine model. The frequency of this NFKB2 mutation in the CVID population is, however, yet to be established.

Diagnosis 
According to a European registry study, the mean age at onset of symptoms was 26.3 years old. As per the criteria laid out by ESID (European Society for Immunodeficiencies) and PAGID (Pan-American Group for Immunodeficiency), CVID is diagnosed if:
 the person presents with a marked decrease of serum IgG levels (<4.5 g/L) and a marked decrease below the lower limit of normal for age in at least one of the isotypes IgM or IgA;
 the person is four years of age or older;
 the person lacks antibody immune response to protein antigens or immunization.

Diagnosis is chiefly by exclusion, i.e. alternative causes of hypogammaglobulinemia, such as X-linked agammaglobulinemia, must be excluded before a diagnosis of CVID can be made.

Diagnosis is difficult because of the diversity of phenotypes seen in people with CVID. For example, serum immunoglobulin levels in people with CVID vary greatly. Generally, people can be grouped as follows: no immunoglobulin production, immunoglobulin (Ig) M production only, or both normal IgM and IgG production. Additionally, B cell numbers are also highly variable. 12% of people have no detectable B cells, 12% have reduced B cells, and 54% are within the normal range. In general, people with CVID display higher frequencies of naive B cells and lower frequencies of class-switched memory B cells. Frequencies of other B cell populations, such as IgD memory B cells, transitional B cells, and CD21 B cells, are also affected, and are associated with specific disease features. Although CVID is often thought of as a serum immunoglobulin and B cell-mediated disease, T cells can display abnormal behavior. Affected individuals typically present with low frequencies of CD4+, a T-cell marker, and decreased circulation of regulatory T cells and iNKT cell. Notably, approximately 10% of people display CD4+ T cell counts lower than 200 cells/mm3; this particular phenotype of CVID has been named LOCID (Late Onset Combined Immunodeficiency), and has a poorer prognosis than classical CVID.

Types

The following types of CVID have been identified, and correspond to mutations in different gene segments.

Treatment

Treatment options are limited, and usually include lifelong immunoglobulin replacement therapy. This therapy is thought to help reduce bacterial infections. This treatment alone is not wholly effective, and many people still experience other symptoms such as lung disease and noninfectious inflammatory symptoms. This treatment replenishes Ig subtypes that the person lacks and is given at frequent intervals for life, and is thought to help reduce bacterial infections and boost immune function. Before therapy begins, plasma donations are tested for known blood-borne pathogens, then pooled and processed to obtain concentrated IgG samples. Infusions can be administered in three different forms: intravenously (IVIg), subcutaneously (SCIg), and intramuscularly (IMIg).

The administration of intravenous immunoglobulins requires the insertion of a cannula or needle in a vein, usually in the arms or hands. Because highly concentrated product is used, IVIg infusions take place every 3 to 4 weeks. Subcutaneous infusions slowly release the Ig serum underneath the skin, again through a needle, and takes place every week. Intramuscular infusions are no longer widely used, as they can be painful and are more likely to cause reactions.

People often experience adverse side effects to immunoglobulin infusions, including:
 swelling at the insertion site (common in SCIG)
 chills
 headache
 nausea (common in IVIG)
 fatigue (common in IVIG)
 muscle aches and pain, or joint pain
 fever (common in IVIG and rare in SCIG)
 hives (rare)
 thrombotic events (rare)
 aseptic meningitis (rare, more common in people with SLE)
 anaphylactic shock (very rare)

In addition to Ig replacement therapy, treatment may also involve immune suppressants, to control autoimmune symptoms of the disease, and high dose steroids like corticosteroids. In some cases, antibiotics are used to fight chronic lung disease resulting from CVID. The outlook for people varies greatly depending on their level of lung and other organ damage prior to diagnosis and treatment.

Epidemiology
CVID has an estimated prevalence of about 1:50,000 in Caucasians. The disease seems to be less prevalent amongst Asians and African-Americans. Males and females are equally affected; however, among children, boys predominate. A recent study of people in Europe with primary immunodeficiencies found that 30% had CVID, as opposed to a different immunodeficiency. 10–25% of people inherited the disease, typically through autosomal-dominant inheritance. Given the rarity of the disease, it is not yet possible to generalize on disease prevalence among ethnic and racial groups. CVID shortens the life-span; but no study currently has a median age recorded. One study suggests the median age of death for men and women is 42 and 44 years old, respectively, but most patients involved in the study are still alive. Those people with accompanying disorders had the worst prognosis (50% survival 33 years after diagnosis) and those people with only CVID-caused frequent infections had the longest survival rates, with another study stating a life expectancy almost equalling that of the general UK population. Additionally, people with CVID with one or more noninfectious complications have an 11 times higher risk of death as compared to people with only infections.

History
Immunodeficiencies comprise many diseases and are genetic defects affecting the immune system. There are roughly 150 immunodeficiencies spanning over 120 genetic defects.
Charles Janeway Sr. is generally credited with the first description of a case of CVID in 1953. The case involved a 39-year-old who had recurrent infections, bronchiectasis, and meningitis. CVID has since emerged as the predominant class of primary antibody deficiencies. It is thought to affect between 1 in 25,000 to 1 in 50,000 people worldwide. Though described in 1953, there was no standard definition for CVID until the 1990s, which caused widespread confusion during diagnosis. During the 1990s, the European Society for Immunodeficiency (ESID) and Pan-American Group for Immunodeficiency (PAGID) developed diagnostic criteria, including minimum age of diagnosis and the need to exclude other conditions, to describe the disease. These criteria were published in 1999 and since that time, some aspects, like increasing the minimum age, have been changed.

Research
Current research is aimed at studying large cohorts of people with CVID in an attempt to better understand age of onset, as well as mechanism, genetic factors, and progression of the disease.

Funding for research in the US is provided by the National Institutes of Health. Key research in the UK was previously funded by the Primary Immunodeficiency Association (PiA) until its closure in January 2012, and funding is raised through the annual Jeans for Genes campaign. Current efforts are aimed at studying the following:
 Causes of complications. Little is known about why such diverse complications arise during treatment.
Underlying genetic factors. Though many polymorphisms and mutations have been identified, their respective roles in CVID development are poorly understood, and not represented in all people with CVID. 
Finding new ways to study CVID. Given that CVID arises from more than one gene, gene knock-out methods are unlikely to be helpful. It is necessary to seek out disease related polymorphisms by screening large populations of people with CVID, but this is challenging given the rarity of the disease.

References

  (IVIG and Aseptic Meningitis, association with SLE)

External links 

 GeneReviews/NCBI/NIH/UW entry on Common Variable Immune Deficiency Overview 

Genetic diseases and disorders
Noninfectious immunodeficiency-related cutaneous conditions
Predominantly antibody deficiencies